Chloroxylon swietenia , the Ceylon satinwood or East Indian satinwood, is a tropical hardwood, the sole species in the genus Chloroxylon (from the Greek χλωρὸν ξύλον, "green wood"). It is native to southern India, Sri Lanka, and Madagascar.

It and Zanthoxylum flavum, the West Indian satinwood, are considered to be the original satinwoods.

Wood 
Its wood is prized for veneers, inlays, fine furniture, and other specialty applications.

Conservation 
Populations have declined due to overexploitation.

References 

Vulnerable plants
Flora of India (region)
Flora of Madagascar
Trees of Sri Lanka
Rutoideae